The Basque Country autonomous basketball team is the basketball team of the Basque Country. The team is not affiliated to FIBA, so only plays friendly games.

History

Basque Country played the Torneo de las Naciones, a tournament co-organized with Galicia and Catalonia. It was played from 2008 to 2010 and basques won the 2008 and 2009 editions.

In summer 2011, Basque Country, coached by Pablo Laso, played three games at Argentina. One against the 'B' team of, other with a team of players of Córdoba and a third game with the Argentina national basketball team. In this last game, where Argentina played with the team of the FIBA Americas Championship won Basque Country by a huge 92–28.

In 2012 the team, coached again by Laso, played two games against Senegal. Basque Country won the first game by 86–74 and lost the second one by 66–82.

Roster
This is the roster of the Basque Country team for the 2016 games against Venezuela.

|}
| valign="top" |
 Head coach

 Assistant coaches

Legend
Club – describes last club before the tournament
Age  – describes age on 17 July 2016
|}

Games played

Women's team

Games played

See also
Torneo de las Naciones
Basque Country national football team

References

Historic data and 2013 rosters at Basque Federation website

External links
Basque Basketball Federation website

 
Basque
Basketball